Mateusz Lipa (born 7 November 1994) is a Polish professional racing cyclist. He rode at the 2015 UCI Track Cycling World Championships.

References

External links
 

1994 births
Living people
Polish male cyclists
Place of birth missing (living people)